The IBM 5280 was designed to compete with the data entry products that were available at the time. The IBM 3740 was the major data entry capability available to convert the data collected at the source, whether high volume, distributed or locally gathered, to make it available in digitized form in databases that were available to the managers and other users, and to make sure that the information was saved securely in storage for future reference. The IBM 5280 followed the design lead of the IBM 3740 but was totally programmable, enhanced the speed and storage of the processor, the speed and amount of available memory for the software to use, the size and clarity of the display, and afforded multiple diskette drives with larger capacity on each diskette. And, it sported an enhanced styling.

History

The IBM 5280 was described by IBM as a "Distributed Data System" in its 1980 announcement. Its role was described as "a new low-cost product family to enter data into larger computers, communicate data and process data on the spot."

The IBM 5280 Distributed Data System paralleled the design of the IBM 3740 system. The main differences were that the products were faster, the software accomplished the tasks better with more/faster memory, larger diskette storage, etc., more data was made available than ever before. The IBM 5280 was a natural replacement for the aging data input products. It provided programmable platform using a fairly well known languages, RPG and COBOL, but it is not a personal computer - although it looked a bit like a more recent pc-desktop display mounted to a desk with a very large CRT monitor. Unfortunately, the users were already beginning to search for personal computers to solve their data problems and within the company, development of 'smart heads' for the main frame interface was well underway, culminating in the release of a PC-based display for the main frames by IBM in 1983 - the IBM 3270 PC. Although it was based on the PC XT and was followed soon after by powerful computing monitors which were also PC-based, the IBM 5280 Distributed Data System was not viewed by these potential users as a PC-based product.

But by 1982 IBM conceded that these offerings had "stiff competition" (described by a securities analyst as "have not been doing all that well.")

However, the real problem for the 5280 System was the competition it faced due to the paradigm shift from expensive Systems from Big Blue and others which were guaranteed to work in the customer's environment - to a personal computing mentality that hit about the same time in the form of very inexpensive, fast personal computers with terrible serviceability but very computer-wise users who were breaking away from the 'care packages' mentality of offerings by Big Blue and others where they had no control in favor of going their own way, but on their own as well. Despite years of struggle, especially with bug-filled but ok much of the time programs such as Microsoft's Windows operating system and the failure of the software developers in general to stand behind what they produced/promised, the paradigm shift occurred - and it was for the best, but at Big Blue's expense.

The IBM 5280 System was intended to be a natural improvement over the IBM 3740 which was now more than 10 years old. However, the industry had spent much of the first five of those years producing the supporting environment for it, but were now at the crossroads where they had to decide if they were going to continue to use the super expensive, guaranteed-not-to-fail IBM 5280, or to move away from what Big Blue was promising them into the nether world of unknown software, incomplete, poorly thought out process changes and daily interruption of work flow due to system crashes of their -not-ready-for-business-but-cheaper-than-dirt- personal computer-based future. They made that decision mainly because it put them more in control of their "stuff" for a lot lower cash outlay - besides that, the kids coming up in the ranks were already whizzes at the pc, having been working with them since high school at least. Only a few had heard of Distributed Data, but that was what the personal computing world did to data - distributed it almost naturally.

This was not without its problem, however, because before long business after business was forced to put restrictions on what their people could use and began to force their people into a cookie cutter world of only certain software in a terribly restricted cookie-cutter computer - the only setup that could be used for their business, etc. Rather than being done by Big Blue, they had to take care of all of this by themselves including protection against malware and viruses that using the main frame would protect them from having to deal with the problem by themselves.But then IBM release the IBM 3270 PC and within the year additional PC-based products with more pc-like characteristics and the decision was made.

So the path forward was clear, and big expensive, though functional, systems like the IBM 5280 were hard to sell to a pc-bent worldview. Besides, there was a huge portion of IBM selling PC-based products that was making the same paradigm shift and saw that the closed system such as the IBM 5280 System was not the way to go from their perspective and the amount of sales impetus on the IBM 5280 Distributed Data System was not nearly sufficient for it to sell very well. The chaos in the business computing market that ensued due to the pc in general and software failure in particular was very painful to watch. The developers of software for businesses essentially used their customers as test subjects for years before the bugs could be ironed out. As a result the businesses chose the winners based on which products most of their people were familiar with, not whether the software is any good, but the flip side is that multiple methods of backup strategies were devised to protect the data from corruption and loss. They survived all of it, and 20 years later we wonder how it is possible that we worked without these things we now enjoy during all of those years past.

Configuration
The following equipment was available for the IBM 5280 Distributed Data System (see the table for more specifications):
 IBM 5285 Programmable Data Station (COBOL, IBM RPG, DE/RPG languages, was built on a very fast microprocessor - not Intel based.
 IBM 5286 Dual Programmable Data Station (COBOL, IBM RPG, DE/RPG), fast microprocessor- not Intel based, single screen split using mirrors to display to both users from a single large display.)
 IBM 5288 Programmable Control Unit (standalone, provides extra resources and computing power to run four Programmable Stations)
 IBM 5225 Printer (line printer up to 580 lines per minute, large printer - floor model, standalone with bi-directional data cable)
 IBM 5256 Printer (Matrix printer up to 120 characters per second, small, table-top printer, standalone with bi-directional data cable)

The configuration of the system is the exclusively the responsibility of the persons who the company has asked to determined which portions of the company will need data distribution products, how many and for which portions of their business environment. Of course, the expense of their decision might play heavily into the final configuration(s) purchased.

When configuring the component equipment for the office complex might consist of several data stations with or without printers attached. Some of the larger offices would likely have similar configuration plus a data converter and a larger printer available on one of the work stations. If a large office complex is available and the data handling capability is needed, then a large number of dual data stations could be used along with possibly another data converter and a line printer attached to an IBM 5281 Programmable Distribute Data Station which is used by the lead person in charge of the operators of the dual work stations. More lead person single stations may be necessary depending on the company and the environment.

Equipment
 Table of Offerings vs. capabilities

(*) In December 1983 IBM increased the maximum internal storage of the 5285 to 96K that "can be configured into several partitions that operate independently." This feature (described as "multiprogramming") already was available in the two higher models.

The IBM 5280 Distributed Data System was designed to make the station independent of the system for which the data was being collected. The work station could be placed in varied environments to allow on-location data entry according to the needs of the user. The dual work station offered an almost double capacity for locations with heavy data entry requirements. The system offered enhancements allow more processing power for programming, etc., through a standalone programmable control unit which could interface with up to four Programmable Stations. To provide interaction with mainframe and other computers as needed, the Programmable Stations connected using a LAN cable for Token Ring to mainframes such as IBM System/360 or IBM System/370 and mid-range computers like IBM System/3, IBM System/36 or IBM System/38.   In addition local matrix  printer capability at 40 cps, 80 cps and 120 cps as well as the faster line printer at up to 500 lines per minute are available connected to the Token Ring makes the system even more usable.

 IBM 5285 Programmable Data Station 
The single station version of the Programmable Data Station is a table top unit mounted to the station table. The table is slightly shorter than a desk top and approximately the same size as a small desk. The unit has locations for multiple 8" floppy drives and connects to the Token Ring LAN if available. See the table above for details about size of memory, etc. The unit is programmable using its own internal memory and code may be written in COBOL or either of two versions of RPG. This ability allows preprocessing of the data to be stored and also makes it possible to generate reports as needed right away.

 IBM 5286 Programmable Dual Data Station 
The dual station version of the Programmable Data Station is a table top unit mounted into the station table. The table is slightly shorter than a desk top and a little larger than a small desk. The unit has locations for multiple 8" floppy drives and connects to the Token Ring LAN if available. The single display is split and with the use of mirrors it possible for both operators to see the display at the same time. See the table above for details about size of memory, other specifications, etc. The unit is programmable using its own internal memory and code may be written in COBOL or either of two versions of RPG. This ability allows preprocessing of the data to be stored and also makes it possible to generate reports as needed right away.

 IBM 5288 Programmable Control Unit 
IBM 5288 Programmable Control Unit is a  standalone processor containing resources and programming to control up to four Programmable Data Stations at one time using the Token Ring LAN in a separate LAN operated by the unit. The Unit has additional memory and programming capacity that can offload the load on the connected Stations, including storage. It also can connect on the Token Ring to the main computers.

 IBM 5225 Printer 
The IBM 5225 printer is referred to as a line printer because it prints the entire line (or most of it) in each pass. It has four models, (1, 2, 3, 4) which collectively offered:
 print speeds of 280, 400, 490 or 560 lines per minute, respectively.
 132 characters per line (10 pitch) or 198  (15 pitch)
 6 or 8 lines per vertical inch
 95 character set or multinational 184 character set

The IBM 5225 was also offered for use with the IBM System/36. In fact, any of the systems (IBM System/3, IBM System/32, IBM System/34, IBM System/36, IBM System/38, IBM AS/400) which support the IBM 5250 protocol Token Ring is likely to have been a user of the IBM 5225 printer.

 IBM 5256 Printer
The IBM 5256 is a dot-matrix printer and is usually referred to as character printer.  The IBM 5256 can print at speeds of 40, 80 or 120 characters per second, depending on the model (1, 2, 3) respectively. The difference between the printers is the speed, but the only hardware change that is required is to move the jumper on the board, except in the case of the 40 cps machine the motor with small pulley and the shorter drive belt must be exchanged for the larger version used on the 80 and 120 cps machines. All three speeds are accommodated by the hardware and the programming on the adapter board. Another advantage of the base printer mechanism (code named Bahia) is the ability to print accurately in both directions (bi-directional printing). The line was queued to the printer and the characters produced appropriately in one direction while the next line was queued and was printed in the opposite direction. If the mechanism was interrupted, it could relocate the position and direction, and continue where it left off as long as the queued information was not lost. To achieve bold characters, the printer could print the bold area, backup, shift slightly and reprint the bold area. This ability did not produce a reliable nor suitable bold so the software did not implement it.

The IBM 5280 system software controlled the data in the form of characters delivered to the hardware to print by way of the LAN adapter, while the IBM 5256 printer adapter determined how to get the printing done in the most rapid manner. 
 
The adapter for the IBM 5256 is operated by a microprocessor with on-board program that keeps track of the operations of the printer, including the timing of the pulses from the sensors that indicate where the head is located and how much the paper has been indexed up or down. There is very tight integration between the printer hardware and the microprocessor - one of the first times this was attempted at the time. The method used to assure that none of the pulses were missed and that they were all addressed properly and in time is the subject of an issued patent. The on-board program could cause the printer to move the head and the platen (paper scrolling) at the same time so that the printing speed was significantly improved. Of course, the paper had to be in position and stopped before printing could begin - all under the control of the dedicated microprocessor on-board the adapter.

The Token Ring adapter is separate from the adapter of the printer and was used to deserialize the data on the ring, presenting it to the printer adapter for action. The data received included characters to print as well as commands for the printer. An undisclosed amount of buffering was available for this function. To assure that the data was not lost, a minimum of at least two lines worth of characters had to be stored in order to be available during the print operation and for recovery after an error if it occurred. Plus the control commands had to be executed in the order they were received in the data stream.

Another feature of the IBM 5256 is the method by which the cover was constructed that allows it to be removed without releasing any screws or taking the printer apart. All that is needed is that the fan-fold paper if it is used, be held out of the way so that the cover can be removed in two half shells. This concept is also the subject of an issued patent.

The IBM 5256 was also offered with the IBM 5250 computer system, which now has become equated with the data stream that the Token Ring offering for IBM 5250 original system. However, the IBM 5256 is available on any IBM computer system that supports the IBM 5250 protocol and any of those systems (IBM System/3, IBM System/32, IBM System/34, IBM System/36, IBM System/38, IBM AS/400) who support the protocol is likely to have been a user of the IBM 5256 printer, but the IBM 5250 system actually lists the IBM 5256 as the printer component on the system in 1980.

Programming languages
DE/RPG or COBOL are the languages supported.

Options
A magnetic stripe reader could be attached.

Applications
The 5280 attracted attention from software vendors.

Clone
A clone of the 5280 was made in Eastern Europe.

References

IBM computers